"Get Down" is a song by English electronic music group Groove Armada. It features Stush and unofficially credited Red Rat. It was released officially on 23 April 2007. The song had already been released as an EP on the iTunes Store. The CD and downloads contain remixes of the song. "Get Down" peaked at number nine on the UK Singles Chart, becoming Groove Armada's first top-10 single, and reached number one on the UK Dance Singles Chart. The pixel art album cover was designed by eBoy.

Track listings
CD single and digital download
 "Get Down" – 3:53
 "Get Down" (Calvin Harris Remix) – 5:30
 "Get Down" (Henrik B. Remix) – 7:19
 "Get Down" (Stretch and Form Remix) – 6:36

12-inch single
 "Get Down" – 3:53
 "Get Down" (Dub Mix) – 7:14

Charts

References

External links
 Official Groove Armada website

2007 singles
2007 songs
Columbia Records singles
Groove Armada songs
Songs written by Andy Cato